Mister World 2010 was the 6th edition of the Mister World competition. It was held at Songdo Convensia in Incheon, South Korea on March 27, 2010. 74 delegates competed from all around the world. Juan García Postigo of Spain crowned Kamal Ibrahim of Ireland at the end of the event.

Introduction
For the first time, South Korea  debuted in the contest and host the Mister World pageant from March 11 to March 27, 2010. Julia Morley said "I am so delighted that we will have the opportunity to showcase the beautiful country of Korea to the rest of the world as our contestants battle it out to find the world's most desirable man". The pageant is supported by the Korean government and people. It is also supported by the former Miss Worlds such as Denise Perrier (1953), Azra Akın (2002), María Julia Mantilla (2004), Taťána Kuchařová (2006) and Zhang Zilin (2007), together with the very first Mister World 1996 Tom Nuyens from Belgium.

Results

Placements

Challenge Events 

 Sports is a test of skill, discipline, and athleticism
 Talent & Creativity focuses on the contestants' performing arts presentation, technique, and dedication
 Fashion looks at the contestants' runway skills, style and bearing, and overall fashion sense

Fast Track Events

Sport

Talent

Top Model

Special Awards

Marine Champions

100 m relay

Cooking Korean Style

Judges
The judges' panel for Mister World 2010 consisted of the following personalities:
Julia Morley – Chairwoman and CEO of Miss World LTD
Tom Nuyens – Mister World 1996
Zhang Zilin – Miss World 2007
Ksenia Sukhinova – Miss World 2008
Andre Kim – Korean designer
Krish Naidoo – Miss World Organization International Ambassador
Kaiane Aldorino – Miss World 2009
Kim Joo-ri – Miss Korea 2009

Contestants

Notes

Debuts

Returns
Last competed in 1996:
 
 
 
 
Last competed in 1998:
 
 
Last competed in 2003:

Withdraws

Crossovers
Mister International
2008:  – Ivan Rusilko (Top 15)
2010:  – Tim Boulenger
2011:  – Ron Wear

Men Universe Model
2010:  – Tim Boulenger
2010:  – Christos Christodoulides (Top 5)
2010:  – Carlos Saúl Orantes Ortega (Top 15)
2010:  – Manuel Illich Lobatón
2010:  – Yuriy Bogish
2011:  – Diego Andres Tuma Bogado

International telecasts
According to the official press release the final competition will be broadcast to some 1 billion viewers in 140 countries.
: CMT
: CCTV
: Sky1
: Televisa
: STS TV Dixi
: STS
: SABC 3
: MBC ESPN (Main broadcaster)
: Sky1
: Bravo and E! Entertainment

References

Mister World
2010 in South Korea
2010 beauty pageants
Beauty pageants in South Korea